Quattrini is the surname of the following people:
 Alessandro Quattrini (b. 1974), retired Italian footballer
  (1864-1950), Italian sculptor
  (1968-), Italian footballer and trainer
 Paola Quattrini (b. 1944), Italian actress
 Selvaggia Quattrini (b. 1975), Italian actress
  (b. 1959), Italian footballer

See also
Quattrino (pl. quattrini), obsolete Italian coin